This is a list of presidents of the Institutional Revolutionary Party of Mexico.

As Partido Revolucionary Institucional (PRI)

As Partido de la Revolución Mexicana (PRM)

As Partido Nacional Revolucionario (PNR)

References

External links
 Official site of the Institutional Revolutionary Party